Eric Beishline is an American convicted murderer who is suspected in the deaths of at least two additional elderly people. He was sentenced to life imprisonment in Missouri.

Biography 
Beishline had a relatively normal childhood. Although he enjoyed playing pranks, he was not mean and even saved a drowning camper when he was 13 years old. According to his parents, Beishline had a promising future, although he was diagnosed as hyperactive at the age of seven. Due to this diagnosis, the young Beishline took ritalin for a period of three years, even though his parents weren't comfortable about their child using the drug.

When Beishline was twelve, he was suspended from school because the director caught him smoking marijuana. His parents consulted a psychologist and forced him to undergo therapy.

In high school Beishline distinguished himself and received honors with his average A− score, in addition to excelling in the wrestling and football teams. He was even named for a prize when he was 17 years old. However, that same year he was arrested for driving under the influence and was readmitted to the program.

At the age of 18 Beishline entered Purdue University and joined a fraternity. The following year he was sent back for cocaine use. He was also sentenced to 30 days in jail in Lafayette, Indiana for stealing a friend's camera, to get enough money for on his addiction. His parents then sent him to live with his grandparents in California, where he "set out on the right path". He completed the rehabilitation program, got a job and a girlfriend. But at a party he used cocaine again, and once more less than a month later.

Drugs 
Beishline began by smoking marijuana, then, among other things, speed and valium. His favourite drug quickly became cocaine.

Trial 
Beishline was charged with first degree murder, elder abuse and robbery.

Crimes 
On January 7, 1993, Beishline called on 84-year old Evelyn Hoech, telling her that he was an insurance agent. When she refused to buy anything, he changed his story. Hoech later said that he had told her that the CIA had sent him to kill his insurance agent. He told her that he needed money to leave the city. When she refused he pointed a gun at her; she told him that if he wanted to kill her, he'd do it and leave the house. Then that Beishline dipped a cloth in liquid, pushed her to the ground and covered her mouth with it. The old lady passed out and when she came to he was gone. Beishline later pled guilty to the charges laid by Hoech.

On January 8, 1993, 72-year old Elisabeth Norton wasn't as lucky. According to the prosecutor Kevin Crane, Beishline entered Norton's home, and tried to sell her insurance. As the old lady wasn't fooled, he hit her, submerged her in chloroform, and threw her body in the Missouri River. In his defence, Missouri's state director of the public defense system, Daniel Gralike, said that his client had not intention of murder and that the 16 years of drug abuse had reduced his mental capabilities. Although he attacked Hoech and Norton with the purpose of stealing from them to finance his addiction, it was not, according to him, a case of murder in the first degree. When he sat on Norton's chest to drug her with chloroform - as he had done with Hoech - Beishline broke his sternum. Despite his speech, the jury accused Beishline of murder in the first degree.

As he was convicted of murder in the first degree, Beishline's fate would be decided by the prosecutor - either life imprisonment or the death penalty.

On January 15, 1993, Cole County officials exhumed the body of 78-year old Herbert Bellman, who was found dead at his home in his home on August 8, 1992. Without an autopsy, the doctors established that Bellman's death was due to a heart attack. But Norton's death led the police to investigate. The bank's reports showed that Bellman had purchased a $15,000 insurance policy from Beishline prior to his death, but no money had been returned. They also found traces of chloroform in his system.

Beishline was also suspected of murdering Irene Miller on December 17, 1992. On September 3, 1992, Miller purchased insurance from Beishline for just over $1,300, but when the old lady was injured in November and made a claim, she was told that no such insurance policy exists. Confronted by another agent, Beishline paid the agency, but on December 16, he received a letter from the vice president of Standard Life Insurances who wanted an explanation for the incident.

The next day, Beishline tried to draw a check for $5,000 from Miller's account, but the bank refused to cash the check because the signature was not the same. He tried to reach Miller by phone, but couldn't contact her, and was told that he could receive the amount if he brought Miller with him. Twenty minutes later, Beishline returned to the bank, saying that Miller could not show up for it. The next morning the bank contacted the police, who sent an officer to Miller's house. He found her dead on the kitchen floor, and it was concluded that a heart attack had been caused by chloroform.

Beishline denied involvement in the additional deaths. He was sentenced to life imprisonment.

See also 
 List of serial killers in the United States

References

Further reading 
 Mercy and Crime - The trial of Eric Beishline

American prisoners and detainees
American prisoners sentenced to life imprisonment
Living people
People convicted of murder by Missouri
Poisoners
Prisoners sentenced to life imprisonment by Missouri
Purdue University alumni
Suspected serial killers
Year of birth missing (living people)